The Royal Family of Broadway is a musical by William Finn and Rachel Sheinkin based on the 1927 play The Royal Family by George S. Kaufman and Edna Ferber. It premiered at the Barrington Stage Company in June 2018.

Productions
The musical is set in the 1920s and loosely based on the legendary Barrymore family.

An earlier version of the same show had an invite-only workshop in 1998. With a book by Richard Greenberg, the cast included Eileen Heckart (Fanny), Donna Murphy (Julia), Claire Lautier (Gwen), Remak Ramsey (Burt), Reg Rogers (Tony), Howard McGillin (Gil, Julia's love interest), Rick Holmes (Perry, Gwen's love interest), Debra Monk (Kitty, Burt's wife), and Dick Latessa (Oscar, the producer).

A second workshop, produced in 2000 by Barry and Fran Weissler, was directed by Jerry Zaks and choreographed by Scott Wise. The cast included Laura Benanti (Gwen), Carolee Carmello (Julie), Tovah Feldshuh (Kitty), Elaine Stritch (Fanny), Bryan Batt (Tony), Jonathan Bleicher (little boy), John Dossett (Gil), Larry Keith (Oscar), and Jeremy Webb (Perry). The ensemble included Cleve Asbury, Jim Borstelman, Susan Fletcher, Casey Miles Good, Susan Hefner, Danette Holden, Joe Locarro, Mary McCloud, Clasi Miller, Mark C. Reif, Josh Rhodes, and Jerome Vivona. 

A private reading was held in March 2001, with a new book by James Lapine. Finn lost the adaptation rights to the play, and then gained the rights again in 2012, with Rachel Sheinkin working on the book. 

The reworked show premiered at the Barrington Stage Company. The show was directed by John Rando and choreographed by Joshua Bergasse. The cast featured, as the Cavendish family: Harriet Harris (Fanny), Laura Michelle Kelly (Julie), Will Swenson (Tony), and Hayley Podschun (Gwen). The cast also featured Arnie Burton (Bert), Kathy Fitzgerald (Kitty Dean), Alan H. Green (Gil), AJ Shively (Perry), and Chip Zien (Oscar). The ensemble featured Holly Ann Butler, Michelle Carter, Tim Fuchs, Eli Goykhman, Tyler Johnson-Campion, Lindsay Kraft, Sam Paley, Tyler Matthew Roberts, Patrick Sharpe, Westley Strausman, Chiara Trentalange, Jake Vacanti, and Noah Virgile. The production was scheduled to run from June 7, 2018 to July 7.

References

2018 musicals
Musicals based on plays
Musicals by William Finn
Plays set in New York City